Wigmore is a suburb/village in the southeast of the Medway conurbation in Kent, England. It is broadly bounded by the A278 road to the west, Rainham to the north and the M2 motorway to the south.

History
The placename is attested in 1275 as Wydemere, from an Old English *wīd-mere "broad pool".

A sparsely-populated hamlet and farming area until the 20th Century, Wigmore was briefly the site of a smallpox isolation hospital (Alexandra Hospital) from 1902, and began to be developed as a village from 1906 when the 365-acre Wigmore agricultural estate was partitioned and sold as plots,  initially as smallholdings (hence the local “Smallholders Club”) and rural shanties for Medway families.

Amenities
St Matthew's Church was founded in 1925 and was replaced in the 1960s by architects Brett, Boyd and Bosanquet. A prefab Evangelical church was opened later.

Now a fully suburbanised village within the East of the Medway Towns, the area has a community primary school, medical centre, and local football team, Wigmore Youth F.C.

Transport
Arriva bus 132 runs between Wigmore, Rainham and Chatham.

References in popular culture
Rock bands associated with the locality-championing Medway scene have referenced Wigmore; The Buff Medways in the song "Medway Wheelers" (2005) and the Len Price 3 with "Wigmore Swingers" (2014).

References

Medway